Table tennis was contested at the 2007 Parapan American Games from August 13 to 18 at the Riocentro in Rio de Janeiro, Brazil.

Participating nations

Medal table
Brazil topped the medal table with a total of 26 medals.

Medalists

Men's

Individual

Team

Open

Women's

Individual

Team

Open

References

 Events at the 2007 Parapan American Games
 2007 in table tennis
 Table tennis at multi-sport events